Daniela Vismane was the defending champion but retired in her first round match against Klaudija Bubelytė.

Emma Navarro won the title, defeating Yuan Yue in the final, 6–4, 6–4.

Seeds

Draw

Finals

Top half

Bottom half

References

External Links
Main Draw

Liepāja Open - Singles